Poriyaalan is a 2014 Indian Tamil-language thriller drama film directed by Thanukumar, written by Manimaran and produced by Vetrimaaran. The film features Harish Kalyan and Rakshita in the leading roles. Velraj is the cinematographer for the venture, while newcomer M. S. Jones Rupert composed the music. The film released on 5 September and had a moderate run.

Cast

 Harish Kalyan as Saravanan
 Rakshita (Anandhi) as Vijaya Shanthi 
 Achyuth Kumar as Sundar
 Mohan Raman as Shastri
 Ajay Raj as Prabhu
 Aadukalam Naren as Construction company boss
 Delhi Ganesh as College principal
 Udhayabhanu Maheswaran as Saravanan's father
 Madhan Bob as Civil engineering professor
 Crane Manohar as Fraud
 Ajay Rathnam as Banker
 Mayilsamy as Uncle
 Fahad Nasar
 Bava Lakshmanan as Land seller
 Munnar Ramesh as Ramesh
 Ravi Venkataraman as Rajendran
 Boys Rajan as Shanti's father
 Velraj as Velraj (Cameo appearance)
 Gaana Bala in a cameo appearance

Soundtrack
 "Yedhedho Sila" - Indira Ramanan
 "Porappu Erappu" - Gaana Bala
 "Kan Rendum" - G. V. Prakash Kumar, Saindhavi
 "Haryana Devathaikku" - Suchitra
 "Un Vizhiyil" - Haricharan

Production
The film was first announced in January 2013, with reports claiming that a Vetrimaaran's Associate  Dharmaraj would make the film for Ace Mass Media with Harish Kalyan in the lead role. The film progressed slowly until November 2013, when it was announced that director Vetrimaaran would produce the film which had been written by Manimaran of Udhayam fame. The film's director was revealed to be Thanukumar, with over ninety percent of the film having been completed. Rakshita, who has previously appeared in Telugu films and in Kayal (2014), played the lead role.

Release 
The distribution rights of the film were acquired by Vendhar Movies. The film was released on 5 September 2014.

Critical reception
Baradwaj Rangan wrote, "Poriyaalan is a sort of sibling to Vetrimaaran’s first film, Polladhavan...What sets these films apart from the typical action-thrillers is their texture — you can taste the grit. The storytelling, after (a) flabby beginning, is superbly economic...the film makes good on its promise of a tight little thriller, with mostly adequate performances". The Times of India gave the film 3 stars out of 5 and wrote, "If the film succeeds, it is mainly because of its screenplay by Mani Maaran. Barring one hard-to-believe turn, it manages to hit the right buttons to keep us on the edge of the seat. It is racy, thrilling and entertaining". Behindwoods.com wrote, "Poriyaalan has a fairly gripping story, with a commendable, but crisp performance from Mohan Raman".

References

External links
 

2014 thriller films
Indian thriller films
2014 films
2010s Tamil-language films
Indian thriller drama films